Erika Dannhoff (2 December 1909 – 18 June 1996) was a German actress. She played the female lead in the 1935 mountain film Demon of the Himalayas.

Filmography

Bibliography
 Holt, Lee Wallace. Mountains, Mountaineering and Modernity: A Cultural History of German and Austrian Mountaineering, 1900-1945. ProQuest, 2008.

External links

1909 births
1996 deaths
German film actresses
Actresses from Berlin
20th-century German actresses